The 1962 LPGA Tour was the 13th season since the LPGA Tour officially began in 1950. The season ran from January 19 to November 4. The season consisted of 29 official money events. Mickey Wright won the most tournaments, 10. She also led the money list with earnings of $21,641. The first Rookie of the Year was won by Mary Mills.

There were four first-time winners in 1962: Shirley Englehorn, Sandra Haynie, who would win 42 LPGA events, Murle Lindstrom, and Kathy Whitworth, who would win a record 88 LPGA events. The season saw the last wins of Louise Suggs (58 career wins) and Patty Berg (60). It also saw the first and only official win by a man, Sam Snead in the Royal Poinciana Plaza Invitational.

The tournament results and award winners are listed below.

Tournament results
The following table shows all the official money events for the 1962 season. "Date" is the ending date of the tournament. The numbers in parentheses after the winners' names are the number of wins they had on the tour up to and including that event. Majors are shown in bold.

Awards

References

External links
LPGA Tour official site

LPGA Tour seasons
LPGA Tour